Axel Herbert Olivecrona (July 11, 1891 – January 1980) was a Swedish professor and brain surgeon, credited with founding the field of Swedish neurosurgery, and pioneering developments in modern neurosurgery.

Family, early life and education 
Herbert Olivecrona was born July 11, 1891 in Visby, Sweden, the son of Axel Olivecrona, a district court judge, and Countess Ebba Cristina Mörner af Morlanda. His brother Karl Olivecrona was a noted Swedish legal scholar, and his son Gustaf Olivecrona a Swedish writer and journalist.

In his youth, he was playing elite bandy. He was part of the IFK Uppsala bandy team which in 1912 played a draw in the final against Djurgårdens IF and shared the Swedish championship that year.

Originally attending school in Uppsala, he began studying medicine at the University of Uppsala in 1909, then transferring to Karolinska Institutet, where he was an assistant in Pathology. He graduated in 1918.

Medical career 
In 1919, Olivecrona received a fellowship from the American-Scandinavian Foundation. This allowed him to engage in experimental work at the Johns Hopkins Institute in Baltimore, Maryland, where he worked with surgery pioneer Harvey Cushing (1869–1939). Olivecrona was offered a residency, and to be Cushing's foreign assistant on the condition that he work for a year at Pierre Marie's clinic in Paris. Due to financial reasons, Olivecrona declined and returned to Sweden, where, as the only neurosurgeon in the city interested in brain tumors, he established the first neurosurgery program at Serafimer Hospital in the 1920s. After further consultation with Cushing, Olivecrona improved his skills, and in 1930 was promoted to the position of assistant surgeon in chief, allowing him to establish a 50-bed neurosurgery department.

In 1935, he became the first professor of neurosurgery at the Karolinska Institute, quite likely the first chair of neurosurgery in all of Europe. Olivecrona was a pioneer in the creation of specific surgical techniques for certain types of brain lesions such as acoustic neuromas, arteriovenous malformations, and berry aneurysms, becoming one of the key neurosurgical instructors in Europe. One of his students, Lars Leksell (1907–1986), went on to make major advances in the development of echoencephalography, and is credited with the invention of radiosurgery.

Among his most famous patients was the Hungarian writer Frigyes Karinthy, whose brain tumor he operated on in 1936. Karinthy put it into a novel titled "A Journey Round my Skull."

In 1955, Olivecrona was elected as a member of the Royal Swedish Academy of Sciences. He retired from the Karolinska in 1960 and went into private practice, during which time he also accepted an invitation to travel to Cairo and establish a neurosurgical unit in Egypt. He later co-wrote a neurosurgical handbook, Handbuch der Neurochirugie. Olivecrona died in January 1980.

Legacy
The Herbert Olivecrona Award, also known as the "Nobel Prize of Neurosurgery", is awarded annually by the Karolinska Institute to a neurosurgeon or neuroscientist who has made an outstanding contribution to the neurosurgical field.

Recipients of the Herbert Olivecrona Award by year:
 John F. Mullan, 1976
 Charles G. Drake, 1977
 M. Gazi Yaşargil, 1978
 Leonard I Malis, 1979
 Lindsay Symon, 1980
 Charles B. Wilson, 1982
 Peter J. Jannetta, 1983
 Kenichiro Sugita, 1984
 John A. Jane, 1985
 Majid Samii, 1987
 William H. Sweet, 1989
 Graham Teasdale, 1991
 Keiji Sano, 1992
 Emil Pasztor, 1993
 Alan Crockard, 1995
 Vinko Dolenc, 1996
 Takanori Fukushima, 1997
 Michael Apuzzo, 1998
 Robert F. Spetzler, 1999
 Albert Rhoton Jr., 2000
 Patrick J. Kelly, 2001
 Nicolas de Tribolet, 2002
 Matti Vapalahti, 2003
 Alexander N. Konovalov, 2004
 Björn Meyerson, 2005
 Niels-Aage Svendgaard, 2005
 Cornelius A. F. Tulleken, 2006
 Ross M. Bullock, 2007
 Bernard George, 2008
 Michael Fehlings, 2009
 Hugues Duffau (fr), 2010
 Ossama al-Mefty, 2011
 Andres Lozano, 2012 
 Marianne Juhler, 2013
 Peter J.A. Hutchinson, 2015
 P. David Adelson, 2016
 L. Dade Lunsford, 2017
 Ali Fadl Krisht, 2019

Selected works
 An experimental study of the circulatory failure in peritonitis (Academical treatise), 1922
 Congenital arteriovenous aneurysms of the carotid and vertebral arterial systems, 1957

References

 Runeberg
Sveriges dödbok 1947-2006, (CD-rom), Sveriges Släktforskarförbund

1891 births
1980 deaths
Swedish nobility
Swedish neurosurgeons
Swedish bandy players
IFK Uppsala Bandy players
20th-century Swedish physicians
20th-century surgeons
Members of the Royal Swedish Academy of Sciences